Claire Clouzot (2 August 1933 – 2 February 2020) was a French film director and journalist.

Biography
Clouzot was the daughter of photographer Rémy Duval and the granddaughter of director Henri-Georges Clouzot. She worked as a photographer and journalist before she began directing in 1980, with the film L’Homme Fragile, starring Richard Berry, Françoise Lebrun, and Didier Sauvegrain.

Clouzot was a delegate at International Critics' Week from 2002 to 2004 when the films Reconstruction and Or (My Treasure) won the Camera d'Or.

She died on 2 February 2020, aged 86.

Filmography
L'homme en question (1976)
L'Homme Fragile (1981)
Rémy Duval, 28 place des Vosges (1986)

Publications
Le Cinéma français depuis la Nouvelle Vague (1972)
Autobiographie d'une pionnière du cinéma, 1873-1968, Alice Guy (1978)
Catherine Breillat. Indécence et pureté (2004)
La Saga des Clouzot et le cinéma (2007)

References

1933 births
2020 deaths
French directors
French journalists
Place of death missing